Mark  Damien Priestley  (9 August 1976 – 27 August 2008) was an Australian actor and comedian. Born in Perth, Western Australia, he graduated from the National Institute of Dramatic Art (NIDA) with a degree in Performing Arts (acting) in 1999. His first big TV break was when he appeared in The Farm in 2000 and met director Kate Woods. She gave him a role in her mini-series Changi in 2001.

Career 
Priestley played a semi-regular role in The Secret Life of Us, had roles in two ABC mini-series-Changi and The Farm and appeared in Blue Heelers before his first on-air appearance in All Saints in July 2004. Priestley was a long-time friend of Wil Traval, his co-star on All Saints. The two were known to get up to countless pranks on set.

Priestley also had some notable theatre credits. He worked with the Bell Shakespeare Company, playing Silvio in The Servant of Two Masters, as well as with The Sydney Theatre Company in Major Barbara, both in 2003.

All Saints 

Priestley's character on the Australian television program All Saints (Dan Goldman) was involved with a storyline with his on-screen wife Erica when the actor took his own life. Coincidentally, the final two episodes Priestley was to play in on the program (written before his death) also involved much tragedy and sadness.

Death 
On the afternoon of 27 August 2008 Priestley checked into the Swissotel in Market Street, Sydney, under the name 'Damien Barker'. He jumped from a window at the hotel at about 2PM. Police confirmed that his body was found in an awning. A police spokesperson said that the incident was not being treated as suspicious. The actor was believed to have been suffering from depression. Priestley continued to be seen posthumously in his All Saints role until 18 November 2008.

Priestley's funeral was held on 4 September 2008 at Perth's Holy Family Catholic Church in Como, with more than 500 people in attendance. Press and camera crews were allowed to enter the church at the permission of the family, under the condition that no details of the eulogy be released in public. Priestley was privately cremated after the ceremony.

Priestley was rewarded for his acclaimed work on All Saints in April 2009, nominated for a posthumous Logie Award for Most Popular Male Actor on Television but lost out to Home and Away actor Todd Lasance. It is also noted at the end of the Channel Seven Perth Telethon 2008 telecast as being in memory of him.

Tributes 
Priestly's co-star John Howard, who played Dr Frank Campion, said Priestley was a fine actor: "He had the most extraordinary combination of very deft comic touch and great emotional depth."

Actor John Waters, who played Dr Mike Vlasek in the series, was stunned. "I worked with him on stage and on screen and will miss him more than I can say right now," Waters said. "Mark the actor was intuitive, and graced every scene in which he appeared with a touch of whimsical genius that only he could apply." Wil Traval, who played Dr Jack Quade, described his friend as a gift. "It’s so sad," he said. "He has some quiet from the pain now." All Saints producer Bill Hughes said he had "lost a friend" and added "His work as an actor is always inventive and his performance in All Saints is a joy to watch,"

Notable roles 
 All Saints (2004–2008) - Nurse Dan Goldman
 The Secret Life of Us (2005) - Marcus Nelson
 Loot (2004) - McLachlan Jutsum
 Blurred (2002) - Calvin Jutsum the Holden Boy
 Changi (2001) - John 'Curley' Foster
 The Farm (2001) - Johnno McCormick
 Better Than Sex (2000) - Guy A
 Warlords Battlecry (2000) (voice in videogame)
 Water Rats (2000) - Luke Harris
 Marriage Acts (2000) - Dan Hawkins

References

External links 

Mark Priestley: A Statement from Channel Seven

1976 births
2008 deaths
Suicides by jumping in Australia
Australian male stage actors
Australian male television actors
People educated at Aquinas College, Perth
Male actors from Perth, Western Australia
Suicides in New South Wales
2008 suicides